Voice of Han Broadcasting Station also known as Voice of Han Chinese Broadcasting Station was founded in 1942 by the Ministry of National Defense.  It is headquartered on Xinyi Road in the Zhongzheng District of Taipei, Taiwan.

History
1942, Voice of Han Radio was located in Mainland China and originally called Military Radio.

1949, the military radio station moved to Taiwan when the Kuomintang retreated following the Chinese Civil War.

1988, the military radio station was renamed to "Voice of Han" and launched more extensive coverage which offered listeners radio programs to listeners nationwide.

2002, on the 60th anniversary celebration of the radio station, President of the Republic of China, Chen Shui-bian broadcast a speech on Voice of Han calling for a communication bride between the two sides of the Taiwan Strait.

2010, Voice of Han Broadcasting in Kinmen added another frequency coverage, including Xiamen, which is located in Mainland China.

Frequency

FM
Northern: FM 106.5 MHz (Hsinchu, Taoyuan, Taipei and Keelung)
Central: FM 104.5 MHz (Hsinchu, Taichung, Nantou)
Chang Southwest Region: FM 101.3 MHz (Changhua, Yunlin, Chiayi, Tainan)
Kaohsiung-Pingtung area: FM 107.3 MHz (Kaohsiung, Pingtung)
Taitung: FM 105.3 MHz
Hualien: FM 104.5 MHz
Yuli: FM 107.3 MHz
Ilan broadcast station: FM 106.5 MHz
Kinmen relay station: FM 107.3 MHz

AM
Taipei: AM 684/1116 kHz
Taichung: AM 1287 kHz
Taoyuan: AM 693/936 kHz
Yunlin: AM 1089 kHz
Tainan: AM 693 kHz
Pingtung: AM 1332 kHz
Hualien: AM 1359/792 kHz
Ilan: AM 1116 kHz
Penghu: AM 1269/846 kHz

Shortwave and Mediumwave
The Voice of Han also broadcasts propaganda programs to Mainland China on shortwave and mediumwave frequencies under the callsign "Voice of Guanghua" (光華之聲). Major programs include: Taiwan New Paradise, Music, Guanghua News, Guanghua Talk Forum, Culture and Education Filling Station, Two sides of the Taiwan Strait, Freedom Scene, Literature Bridge, Taiwan Strait Flyover, and Lookout Tower.
Mainland China: 801 kHz, 846 kHz, 711 kHz, 981 kHz, 9745 kHz, 6105 kHz

See also
 Media of Taiwan
 Radio Taiwan International
 Propaganda in the Republic of China
 Fu Hsing Broadcasting Station
 Cross-Strait war of propaganda
 China National Radio
 Voice of the Strait

References

External links

Mass media of the military
Military of the Republic of China
Mandarin-language radio stations
Radio stations in Taiwan
Censorship in China
Mass media in Taipei
Public broadcasting in Taiwan
Propaganda in Taiwan